Suhelva Sanctuary is a wildlife sanctuary located in Balrampur, Gonda and Sravasti districts of the state of  Uttar Pradesh in India. It is about 66 km from Balrampur, 120 km from Gonda and about 210 km from Lucknow. It covers an area of 452 square kilometers.

History
The forest is one of the oldest forests in Uttar Pradesh and was given the status of a wildlife sanctuary in 1998.

Access

By air
Lucknow Airport is located 230 km from Suhelva.Varanasi Airport is located about 350 km from the sanctuary.

By rail
The nearest railway station from Suhelva is Tulsipur about 38 km from the sanctuary.

By road
Suhelva is well connected by roads to every part of the state.

Flora 
The Sal, Sheesham, Khair, Sagaun (Teak), Asna, Jamun, Haldu, Phaldu, Dhamina, Jhingan and Bahera trees make up the forest cover of the sanctuary.

Fauna
The main mammals of Suhelva are Bengal tiger, Indian leopard, sloth bear, antelope and deer. Other animals include fox, hyena, Indian elephant and wild cat.

See also
 Chuka
 Dudhwa National Park

References

Wildlife sanctuaries in Uttar Pradesh
Balrampur district, Uttar Pradesh
Shravasti district
1998 establishments in Uttar Pradesh
Protected areas established in 1998